Port Liberté is a section of Jersey City located on Caven Point, formerly one of the last natural sand beaches on the Upper New York Bay. The community is a European style village located along the western side of Upper New York Bay. The community has canals, gardens, playgrounds, and a restaurant. The many luxury condominiums and townhouses offer views of Manhattan and the Statue of Liberty. In addition, many of the residences have canals on the back making the village perfect for boating. Many of the canals are also lined with walkways, gardens, and docks. The Liberty National Golf Club and the Caven Point section of Liberty State Park neighbor the development on the north and east respectively, and are accessible via the Hudson River Waterfront Walkway.

Transportation
NY Waterway-operated ferries travel to the Battery Maritime Building in Manhattan.

The 981 Port Liberte-Grove Street bus used to serve the area before it was discontinued on May 29, 2010. The development owners have expanded their own shuttle service in response.

Hancock House 
Port Liberté was built on the site of a house, named the Hancock House, that was visited by General Marquis de Lafayette during the Revolutionary War to spy on British troops in New York City.  The house was demolished some time in the 20th century.

History
The new set of real estate was designed by François Spoerry, a French architect, who invented the concept of "soft architecture", that would prefigure new urbanism. He developed the concept at Port Grimaud, a waterfront project in Saint-Tropez, France, and attempted to adapt it at Port Liberté.

Commenced in the 1980s, this European-style mixed-use complex planned for 2,280 residential units, a 245-boat slip marina, 590 canal boat slips, 350-room hotel, a  office building, retail/commercial spaces recreation facilities, a health club and a yacht club. However, the complexity of the design, the costly canal engineering and the collapse of Wall Street in the late 1980s drove the project to bankruptcy. Only 37 town homes and 363 of the planned residential units are completed. Joseph Barry of the Applied Company based at Hoboken, New Jersey took it over, abandoned the canal plan and completed Phase 1 and Phase 2 of construction in early 2000s.

References

External links 
Port Liberte on Facebook offers insights and facts about the community's past and present.
(Official Developer Site)
 

Neighborhoods in Jersey City, New Jersey
Gated communities in New Jersey